Kiril Vadymovych Fesyun (born 7 August 2002) is a Ukrainian professional footballer who plays as a goalkeeper for Kolos Kovalivka.

Career

Yunist Chernihiv
Born in Chernihiv, Fesyun is a product of the local Yunist Chernihiv sportive school system.

Kolos Kovalivka
He played for FC Vorskla in the Ukrainian Premier League Reserves, and in March 2021 he transferred to Kolos Kovalivka in the Ukrainian Premier League. He made his debut as a starter against FC Inhulets Petrove on 18 September.

International career
On 15 May 2022, Fesyun was called up to the Ukraine under-21 squad.

References

External links 
 Profile from Kolos Kovalivka website
 
 

2002 births
Living people
Footballers from Chernihiv
Ukrainian footballers
FC Yunist Chernihiv players
FC Vorskla Poltava players
FC Kolos Kovalivka players
Ukrainian Premier League players
Association football goalkeepers
Ukraine under-21 international footballers